Daniel Danielsen Knoff (1614–1687) was a Dano-Norwegian civil servant and politician.  He served as the County Governor of three different counties: Romsdalen county from 1680 until 1681, Lister og Mandal county from 1681 until 1683, and in Stavanger county from 1683 until his death in 1687.

Knoff was born in Roskilde in Denmark. He was a Norwegian businessman and customs administrator. In 1649, he was employed as a customs officer at Bragernes, working as the general customs administrator over the southern part of Norway from 1655 to 1670 and 1673–80. He built a large farm at Strømsø and owned several ironworks and farms in the area. Knoff played an important role in the fight for market town rights for Strømsø and Bragernes (later they merged to form the town of Drammen). He then went on to serve the King as a county governor in three different counties.

References

1614 births
1687 deaths
County governors of Norway